The Monkey King 3 is a 2018 Chinese fantasy film  based on the classic novel Journey to the West by Wu Cheng'en. The film is the third installment of the Monkey King franchise, after The Monkey King (2014) and The Monkey King 2 (2016). Directed and produced by Cheang Pou-soi, the film stars Aaron Kwok, Feng Shaofeng, Xiao Shenyang, Him Law and Zhao Liying. The film was released on February 16, 2018, the first day of the Chinese New Year holiday period. It received mixed reviews from critics.

Plot
Sun Wukong (Aaron Kwok), Tang Sanzang (Feng Shaofeng), Zhu Bajie (Xiaoshenyang) and Sha Wujing (Him Law) – inadvertently enter the Womanland of Western Liang, a nation populated by women raised to believe that men are fatally deceptive in matters of the heart.

Love nevertheless blossoms between Tang Sanzang and the Womanland's young queen (Zhao Liying), even though her royal preceptor (Gigi Leung) is hell-bent on sentencing the men to death. As Sun Wukong, Zhu Bajie and Sha Wujing search for a way out of this nation surrounded by a vast magical net, it soon transpires, conveniently, that romantic love is the only key to opening the gate.

Cast
 Aaron Kwok as Sun Wukong, the Monkey King
 Feng Shaofeng as Tang Sanzang, the Buddhist monk
 Xiaoshenyang as Zhu Bajie, the pig demon
 Him Law as Sha Wujing, the water-buffalo
 Zhao Liying as the Ruler of Women's Country
 Lin Chi-ling as Hebo 
 Gigi Leung as Advisor 
 Liu Tao as Guanyin 
 Kingdom Yuen as Priest
 Cecilia So as young advisor
 Sire Ma

Production

Casting 
Zhao Liying was cast in the role of the Ruler of Women's Country. The original cast members of The Monkey King 2: Aaron Kwok, Feng Shaofeng, Xiaoshenyang and Him Law reprised their roles as Sun Wukong, Tang Sanzang, Zhu Bajie and Sha Wujing respectively in the film. Liu Tao, Lin Chi-ling, and Gigi Leung joined the cast for this installment.

Filming 
Hollywood talent Shaun Smith (300, I am Legend, The Monkey King 2) returned as the special makeup effects supervisor/designer for the Monkey King 3. Principal photography began in December 2016 and concluded in early April 2017.

Release
The Monkey King 3 was released in China on February 16, 2018.

Reception
On Metacritic, which assigns a normalized rating, the film has a weighted average score of 51 out of 100 based on 4 critics, indicating "mixed or average reviews". On Tianjin Maoyan Culture Media's ticketing website the film has received a 7.8/10 from the audience based on over 240,000 reviews.

Elizabeth Kerr from The Hollywood Reporter believes that the film is "bonker(s), but in a charming, delirious sort of way" with "enough eye-catching set pieces". As for actors, Aaron Kwok delivers a "strong performance...that's far more nuanced than it needs to be", while "Feng and Zhao are a less than riveting couple, making their dilemmas leaden soap opera instead of compelling crises of conscience or identity". She also points out that even the Queen's still "begging for the men's help" and notes that The Monkey King 3 is missing its opportunity to make the female characters "active-not-reactive".

China's noted film critic Raymond Zhou regards The Monkey King 3 as inferior to its predecessor, The Monkey King 2. He criticized that the CGI effect is more credible than the story is and that both of two romantic leads have no chemistry. He commented that Feng Shaofeng's performance is reliable among leads.

Senior film critic Derek Elley, however, credits The Monkey King 3 as "the most engaging of the three films on a character level, with a relaxed tone and often silly humour that also help to bolster its "human" face". Xuanzang's role is "always a difficult one to bring off amid such colourful company (Aaron Kwok, Xiaoshenyang, and Luo Zhongqian)", but Feng Shaofeng "manages to make Xuanzang sympathetic"; Zhao fails to "dominate the film as her character should"; Gigi Leung "grabs the spotlight" while her character is not "fully-drawn"; Lin Zhiling "has a couple of memorable moments in the CGI-heavy finale".

References

External links
 
 

2018 films
2010s Mandarin-language films
Chinese mythology in popular culture
2010s children's fantasy films
Chinese children's films
2018 fantasy films
Hong Kong 3D films
Hong Kong fantasy films
Hong Kong martial arts films
Chinese 3D films
Chinese fantasy films
Chinese sequel films
Films directed by Cheang Pou-soi
Martial arts fantasy films
Films based on Journey to the West
2018 3D films
2018 martial arts films
2010s Hong Kong films